In Greek mythology, Bias may refer to the following characters:
 Bias, a Megarian prince as a son of King Lelex and brother to Cleson and Pterelaus. He was killed by his nephew Pylas, also a Megarian king. After the murder, Pylas gave the kingdom to the deposed king of Athens, Pandion and later founded the city of Pylos in Peloponnesus.
 Bias, son of Amythaon and brother of Melampus.
 Bias, son of Melampus and Iphianira thus a nephew of the earlier Bias. But his name has been proposed to read "Abas", another son of Melampus.
 Bias, one of the Epigoni and son of Parthenopaeus, one of the Seven Against Thebes.
 Bias, a Trojan prince as one of the sons of King Priam of Troy by other women. He was the father of two Trojan warriors, Laogonus and Dardanus.
 Bias, an Athenian soldier who supported Menestheus against the attacks of Hector.
 Bias, a Pylian soldier who fought under their leader Nestor during the Trojan War.
 Bias, one of the Suitors of Penelope who came from Dulichium along with other 56 wooers. He, with the other suitors, was slain by Odysseus with the aid of Eumaeus, Philoetius, and Telemachus.

See also 
  for Jovian asteroid 38050 Bias

Notes

References 
 Apollodorus, The Library with an English Translation by Sir James George Frazer, F.B.A., F.R.S. in 2 Volumes, Cambridge, MA, Harvard University Press; London, William Heinemann Ltd. 1921. ISBN 0-674-99135-4. Online version at the Perseus Digital Library. Greek text available from the same website.
 Apollonius Rhodius, Argonautica translated by Robert Cooper Seaton (1853-1915), R. C. Loeb Classical Library Volume 001. London, William Heinemann Ltd, 1912. Online version at the Topos Text Project.
 Apollonius Rhodius, Argonautica. George W. Mooney. London. Longmans, Green. 1912. Greek text available at the Perseus Digital Library.
 Diodorus Siculus, The Library of History translated by Charles Henry Oldfather. Twelve volumes. Loeb Classical Library. Cambridge, Massachusetts: Harvard University Press; London: William Heinemann, Ltd. 1989. Vol. 3. Books 4.59–8. Online version at Bill Thayer's Web Site
 Diodorus Siculus, Bibliotheca Historica. Vol 1-2. Immanel Bekker. Ludwig Dindorf. Friedrich Vogel. in aedibus B. G. Teubneri. Leipzig. 1888–1890. Greek text available at the Perseus Digital Library.
 Gaius Julius Hyginus, Fabulae from The Myths of Hyginus translated and edited by Mary Grant. University of Kansas Publications in Humanistic Studies. Online version at the Topos Text Project.
 Homer, The Iliad with an English Translation by A.T. Murray, Ph.D. in two volumes. Cambridge, MA., Harvard University Press; London, William Heinemann, Ltd. 1924. . Online version at the Perseus Digital Library.
Homer, Homeri Opera in five volumes. Oxford, Oxford University Press. 1920. . Greek text available at the Perseus Digital Library.
 Pausanias, Description of Greece with an English Translation by W.H.S. Jones, Litt.D., and H.A. Ormerod, M.A., in 4 Volumes. Cambridge, MA, Harvard University Press; London, William Heinemann Ltd. 1918. . Online version at the Perseus Digital Library
 Pausanias, Graeciae Descriptio. 3 vols. Leipzig, Teubner. 1903.  Greek text available at the Perseus Digital Library.

Children of Priam
Princes in Greek mythology
Achaeans (Homer)
Trojans
Suitors of Penelope